The Manning River Times, also published as The Manning River Times and Advocate for the Northern Coast Districts of New South Wales, is a twice weekly English language newspaper published in Taree, New South Wales, Australia.

History 
The Manning River Times is currently published in Taree, New South Wales, by Australian Community Media. The newspaper is titled after the Manning River which is a prominent river system near the town of Taree. The Manning River Times started publication in 1952 and is still published currently. Previously to 1952 the newspaper was published as The Manning River Times and Advocate for the Northern Coast Districts of New South Wales. It was first published by William Burnham Boyce (1869-1968) in 1896.

The Manning River Times and Advocate for the Northern Coast Districts of New South Wales was published twice a week on Wednesday and Saturday up until 1954. In 1954 under the title Manning River Times it expanded publication to 3 times a week on Monday, Wednesday and Friday. However the Manning River Times is currently published twice a week on Wednesday and Friday.

Digitisation 
The paper has been digitised as part of the Australian Newspapers Digitisation Program of the National Library of Australia.

See also 
List of newspapers in New South Wales
List of newspapers in Australia

References

External links 

Fairfax Media
Newspapers published in New South Wales
Newspapers on Trove